Aokautere is a suburb of the New Zealand city of Palmerston North. It is situated in the cliffs on the south banks of the Manawatu River.

Aokautere is named after Te Aokautere, a great Rangitāne chief during the late 18th century. In the 19th century, it was known as Fitzherbert, after the politician William Fitzherbert who promoted settlement of the Manawatu. The Fitzherbert East Dairy Factory building still carries the name these days.

Aokautere has views of the Ruahine and Tararua Ranges (with the Wind Turbine Farms) and on a clear day it is possible to see Ruapehu.

Anzac Park (Te Motu-o-Poutoa), a clifftop reserve colloquially known as Pork Chop Hill, has views across the city, through to the southern Ruahine and northern Tararua ranges. It is also possible to see distant Taranaki and Ruapehu. There is also access to the Stairway of Tāne (Te Arapiki-a-Tāne), steps cut into the former Anzac Cliffs, now collapsed into a slope.

Prior to 1996, Aokautere was part of the Manawatu electorate. However, due to the reformation of the electoral system from FPP to MMP, the electorate of Palmerston North's boundaries were redrawn to include Aokautere. Palmerston North's electorate boundaries were redrawn in 2007 and Aokautere was shifted to the Rangitikei electorate. Rangitikei as of 2020 is represented by National MP Ian McKelvie, who was elected in 2011.

Demographics

There were 237 households. There were 384 males and 384 females, giving a sex ratio of 1.0 males per female. The median age was 40.6 years (compared with 37.4 years nationally), with 186 people (24.3%) aged under 15 years, 123 (16.1%) aged 15 to 29, 354 (46.3%) aged 30 to 64, and 102 (13.3%) aged 65 or older.

Ethnicities were 88.6% European/Pākehā, 8.6% Māori, 1.6% Pacific peoples, 5.1% Asian, and 3.1% other ethnicities (totals add to more than 100% since people could identify with multiple ethnicities).

The proportion of people born overseas was 24.7%, compared with 27.1% nationally.

Although some people objected to giving their religion, 52.9% had no religion, 38.8% were Christian, 1.2% were Hindu, 0.4% were Buddhist and 1.6% had other religions.

Of those at least 15 years old, 222 (38.3%) people had a bachelor or higher degree, and 51 (8.8%) people had no formal qualifications. The median income was $43,100, compared with $31,800 nationally. The employment status of those at least 15 was that 273 (47.2%) people were employed full-time, 132 (22.8%) were part-time, and 18 (3.1%) were unemployed.

Aokautere Rural

It had a population of 690 at the 2018 New Zealand census, an increase of 45 people (7.0%) since the 2013 census, and an increase of 153 people (28.5%) since the 2006 census. There were 243 households. There were 336 males and 351 females, giving a sex ratio of 0.96 males per female. The median age was 43.4 years (compared with 37.4 years nationally), with 144 people (20.9%) aged under 15 years, 108 (15.7%) aged 15 to 29, 354 (51.3%) aged 30 to 64, and 84 (12.2%) aged 65 or older.

Ethnicities were 91.3% European/Pākehā, 8.3% Māori, 0.9% Pacific peoples, 3.5% Asian, and 3.9% other ethnicities (totals add to more than 100% since people could identify with multiple ethnicities).

The proportion of people born overseas was 18.7%, compared with 27.1% nationally.

Although some people objected to giving their religion, 56.1% had no religion, 34.3% were Christian, 0.9% were Muslim, 0.4% were Buddhist and 0.9% had other religions.

Of those at least 15 years old, 189 (34.6%) people had a bachelor or higher degree, and 54 (9.9%) people had no formal qualifications. The median income was $46,400, compared with $31,800 nationally. The employment status of those at least 15 was that 327 (59.9%) people were employed full-time, 99 (18.1%) were part-time, and 15 (2.7%) were unemployed.

Education

The Institute of the Pacific United (IPU, formerly International Pacific College) is located in Aokautere.

References

Suburbs of Palmerston North
Populated places in Manawatū-Whanganui
Populated places on the Manawatū River